Danny is a masculine given name. It is related to the male name Daniel. It may refer to:

People
Danny Altmann, British immunologist
Danny Antonucci, Canadian animator, director, producer, and writer
Danny Baker (born 1957), English journalist, radio and TV presenter
Danny Barnes (disambiguation), several people
Danny Bonaduce (born 1959), American radio/television personality, comedian
Danny Brown (born 1981), American rapper
Danny Joe Brown (1951–2005), American singer, Molly Hatchet
Danny Burawa (born 1988), American baseball player
Danny Carey (born 1961), American drummer, Tool
Danny Chan (born 1975), Hong Kong actor, martial artist, dance choreographer, and singer
Danny Clark (disambiguation), several people
Danny Collins (footballer) (born 1980), Welsh footballer
Danny Boy Collins (born 1967), English wrestler
Danny Coulombe (born 1989), American baseball player
Danny Cox (disambiguation), several people
Danny Denzongpa (born 1948), Indian actor
Danny DeVito (born 1944), Italian-American actor, comedian, producer and director
Danny Donnelly (politician), Northern Irish politician
Danny Drinkwater (born 1990), English footballer
Danny Duffy (born 1988), American baseball player
Danny Duncan (musician) (born 1986), musician, We the Kings
Danny Dyer (born 1977), English actor and presenter
Danny Elfman (born 1953), American composer, singer, songwriter and record producer
Danny Etling (born 1994), American football player
Danny Franco (born 1973), Israeli basketball coach
Danny Glover (born 1946), American actor
Danny Gonzales (born 1976), American football coach and former player
Danny Gonzalez (born 1994), American YouTube personality
Danny Graham (disambiguation), several people
Danny Gray (rugby union) (born 1983), English rugby union footballer
Danny Gray (American football) (born 1999), American football player
Danny Green (disambiguation), several people
Danny Hutton (born 1942), Irish-American singer and songwriter
Danny Ings (born 1992), English footballer
Danny Isidora (born 1994), American football player
Danny Jansen (born 1995), American baseball player
Danny Johnson (American football) (born 1995), American football player
Danny Kaye (1911–1987), American entertainer
Danny Kirwan (1950–2018), English singer-songwriter, guitarist, Fleetwood Mac
Danny Lee (disambiguation), several people
Danny Lewis (basketball) (born 1970), American-English basketball player
Danny Lopez (disambiguation), several people
Danny Mendick (born 1993), American baseball player
Danny Miller (disambiguation), several people
Danny Morseu (born 1958), Australian basketball player
Danny Murphy (disambiguation), several people
Danny Noonan (disambiguation), several people
Danny O'Brien (disambiguation), several people
Danny Ozark (1923–2009), American baseball manager
Daniel Pearl (1963–2002), American murder victim
Danny Pearson (musician) (1953–2018), American composer and singer-songwriter
Danny Piccinone (born 2003), American entertainer
Danny Pinter (born 1996), American football player
Danny Pittman (born 1958), American football player
Danny Roberts (disambiguation), several people
Danny Rose (disambiguation), several people
Danny Rubin (basketball) (born 1991), American-Israeli basketball player
Danny Saucedo (born 1986), Swedish singer-songwriter
Danny Schayes (born 1959), American basketball player, son of Dolph
Danny Simpson (born 1987), English footballer
Danny Smith (disambiguation), several people
Danny Smythe (1948–2016), American drummer, The Box Tops
Danny Thomas (disambiguation), several people
Danny Trejo (born 1944), American actor
Danny Valencia (born 1984), American baseball player
Danny Vukovic, Australian footballer
Danny Wallace (footballer) (born 1964), English footballer
Danny Wallace (humorist) (born 1976), British author and television presenter
Danny Ward (footballer, born 1993) (born 1993), Welsh football player
Danny Williams (disambiguation), several people
Danny Wilson (disambiguation), several people
 Danny Woods (1942–2018), American singer, member of the group Chairmen of the Board
Danny Worsnop (born 1990), English singer, Asking Alexandria
Danny Young (disambiguation), several people

Stage name

 Danny (footballer), Portuguese footballer, Daniel Miguel Alves Gomes
 Danny!, stage name of American recording artist and producer Danny Swain
 Danny, stage name of Finnish singer Ilkka Lipsanen
 Danny, Daniel Murillo, lead vocalist of the band Hollywood Undead and formerly Lorene Drive
 Danny Romero, stage name of Daniel Ramírez Romero, Spanish singer
 Danny Saucedo, aka "Danny," Swedish singer
 Danny Sexbang, stage name of Leigh Daniel Avidan, singer of musical comedy duo, Ninja Sex Party

Fictional characters
 Danny, in the 2002 animated film Return to Never Land
 Danny, in the 2005 American science fiction adventure Zathura: A Space Adventure
 Danny, in the 2012 American horror film Sloppy the Psychotic
 Danny Baldwin, in the British soap opera Coronation Street
 Danny Baker (character), in the comedy TV show 30 Rock
 Danny Burke, in the 1984 American teen sex comedy movie Revenge of the Nerds
 Danny Collins, in the film of the same name
 Danny Dallas, in TV series Soap
 Danny Dog, in Peppa Pig
 Danny Fatfuck, in the Adult Swim television pilot Paid Programming
 Danny Madigan, played by Austin O'Brien in the 1993 American fantasy meta action comedy movie Last Action Hero
 Danny Messer, in the TV crime drama CSI: NY
 Danny Mitchell (EastEnders), in the British soap opera EastEnders
 Danny Moon, in the British soap opera EastEnders
 Danny Noonan, the main protagonist in the movie Caddyshack
 Danny O'Neil, in the 1988 movie 14 Going on 30
 Danny Phantom (character), alter-ego of Daniel "Danny" Fenton and the title character of the Nickelodeon cartoon series Danny Phantom
 Danny Pink, in Doctor Who
 Danny Rand, also known as Iron Fist, a Marvel superhero
 Danny Rebus, from the TV series The Electric Company
 Danny Rayburn, in the Netflix series Bloodline
 Danny Tanner, in the TV sitcom Full House
 Danny the Street, a living, sentient street of DC Comics' Doom Patrol
 Danny Thornill, in the film Cyberbully
 Danny Torrance, in the 1977 novel The Shining
 Danny Van Zandt, in Degrassi: The Next Generation
 Danny Walker, in the 2001 film Pearl Harbor
Danny "Danno" Williams, in the 1968–1980 television series Hawaii Five-O
Danny "Danno" Williams, in the 2010 remake series Hawaii Five-0
 Danny Williams, in the TV series My Little Pony
 Danny Zuko, in the musical Grease
 Danny (Pokémon), in the Pokémon universe
 Danny, the main male orange cat in the film Cats Don't Dance
 Danny, in the Just! series of short story collections by Australian author Andy Griffiths
 Danny, nickname of Mrs. Danvers, the main antagonist of Daphne du Maurier's 1938 novel Rebecca
 Danny, in the anime Sonic X
 Danny, the leader of The Bash Street Kids from the British comic The Beano
 Danny, in the martial arts action thriller Unleashed
 Danny, title character in the 2016 song cycle The Seven Doors of Danny
Danny (PAW Patrol), a recurring character in PAW Patrol

See also
 
 
 Dan (disambiguation)
 Daniel (disambiguation)
 Dany (disambiguation)

Masculine given names
Hypocorisms
English masculine given names